Hesam Manzour (born December 9, 1980) is an Iranian actor. He is best known for his roles in the television dramas Lady of the Mansion (2018–2019), Dear Brother (2019) and Najla (2020–2022). In 2019, he won Hafez Award for Best Actor in a Drama Television series for portraying Arsalan Mirza in Lady of the Mansion.

Filmography

Film

Web

Television

Music video

Awards and nominations

References

External links 

 

Iranian dramatists and playwrights
Iranian theatre directors
1980 births
Iranian male film actors
Iranian male television actors
Iranian male stage actors
Living people
All articles with unsourced statements
Male actors from Tehran